Vasiliy Golovnin is a Russian Project 10620 icebreaking cargo ship built in 1988 in the Ukrainian Soviet Socialist Republic. The vessel is operated by Russia's Far East Shipping Company (FESCO).

The Vasiliy Golovnin has regularly been chartered for entire seasons, including by Australia, New Zealand, and Argentina.

On April 29, 2019, TASS reported that 2 crew members died from methanol poisoning.

References

Ships of Russia